Luteuthis shuishi is a species of octopus that lives in the South China Sea, which is known only from one female specimen collected at a depth of 767 meters. It has short arms and is quite gelatinous. The octopus's total length is about 300 millimeters.

References

Octopuses
Molluscs
Molluscs described in 2002
Marine molluscs of Asia
Species known from a single specimen